Cao Cao is the fourth studio album by Singaporean singer JJ Lin, released on 17 February 2006 by Ocean Butterflies.

Track listing
 "只對你說" (Sarang Heyo)
 "曹操" (Cao Cao)
 "熟能生巧" (Perfection)
 "波間帶" (Sign Waves)
 "原來" (Truth)
 "不死之身" (Eternal Life)
 "愛情Yogurt" (Yogurt Love)
 "進化論" (Evolution)
 "Now That She's Gone"
 "你要的不是我" (Scrubbed Out)
 "流行主教" (Prince of Pop)
 "Down" (Demo)

References

2006 albums
JJ Lin albums